The Treaty of Sahagún, being a treaty signed at Sahagún, may refer to:
Treaty of Sahagún (1158)
Treaty of Sahagún (1170)